Franz Carl Mertens (3 April 1764 – 19 June 1831) was a German botanist who was a native of Bielefeld. He specialized in the field of phycology.

Mertens studied theology and languages at the University of Halle, and after graduation taught classes at Bremen Polytechnic College. In his spare time he studied botany, and through a mutual friend met German botanist Albrecht Wilhelm Roth (1757–1834). With Roth, he took scientific expeditions throughout Europe, including Scandinavia.

From these trips, Mertens described a number of species of algae. He also performed illustrative work on Volume 3 of Roth's Catalecta botanica. With Erlangen professor Wilhelm Daniel Joseph Koch (1771–1849), he published the third edition of Johann Christoph Röhling's Deutschlands flora, a five volume treatise on German flora.

The plant genus Mertensia from the family Boraginaceae is named after him, while the ctenophore genus Mertensia is named after his son Karl Heinrich Mertens (1796-1830).

See also
 European and American voyages of scientific exploration

References 
 Hunt Institute for Botanical Documentation

1764 births
1831 deaths
Scientists from Bielefeld
19th-century German botanists
German phycologists
18th-century German botanists